Jimmy Odukoya is a Nigerian actor. He played the role of Oba Ade in the 2022 movie The Woman King alongside Viola Davis and John Boyega. He is a son of Bimbo Odukoya and Taiwo Odukoya.

Filmography 
 Baby Palaver (2018)
 Crazy Grannies (2021)
 I am Nazzy (2022)
 The Woman King (2022)

References

Living people
Year of birth missing (living people)
21st-century Nigerian actors